Cyclophora posticamplum is a moth in the family Geometridae first described by Charles Swinhoe in 1892. It is found in the north-eastern Himalayas and on Borneo and Peninsular Malaysia.

Subspecies
Cyclophora posticamplum posticamplum (north-eastern Himalayas, Peninsular Malaysia)
Cyclophora posticamplum expunctor (Prout, 1932) (Borneo)

References

Moths described in 1892
Cyclophora (moth)
Moths of Asia